HiLITE Business Park is the first business park in Kerala offering office & commercial spaces for rent for startups and corporate companies. HiLITE Business Park is constructed by HiLITE Builders near HiLITE Mall as part of the HiLITE City project. Catering to IT and non-IT corporate firms with more than 100+ office spaces ranging from 1,125 sq. ft. to 30,000 sq. ft.

HiLITE Business Park is constructed in twin 'S' shape with centralized A/C, 24 hours power backup and parking for more than 1500 vehicles.

Facilities
 100+ IT and non-IT corporates
 Centralized A/C
 5 Lifts
 Food court
 24 Hours power backup
 Parking for 1500+ vehicles
 24 Hour maintenance support

Present Companies
WebNamaste, Nucore, Team SignIn, Minimalister, Spanning Tree, Flew Hub, HiLITE Interiors, Vinam Solutions, CAFIT, Wiinnova, Baabtra, iBird, Hug A Mug, Human Care Foundation, Purpose Code Solutions, Sparrow Solutions, Flyingloop Technologies, Codelattice, Digibiz, limenzy, vitezlab, Evonturz Branding Solutions Pvt. Ltd., Hilite projects pvt ltd., GrowthInfluencer, 360 Dental Marketing Agency, Codilar Technologies

References

External links
 http://uniquetimes.org/hilite-business-park/
 
 http://www.fwdlife.in/tag/hilite-business-park

Business parks of India